Jeremy Stewart Smith (born 23 October 1988 in Launceston, Tasmania) is an Australian cricketer who plays for the Tasmania Tigers on a rookie contract. He represented the Australian team at the 2008 U/19 Cricket World Cup, taking three wickets. In February 2009 he made his List A debut against Victoria.

See also
 List of Tasmanian representative cricketers

External links
CricketArchive Profile
Cricinfo Profile

Tasmania cricketers
Australian cricketers
1988 births
Living people